The Cinemateca Nacional de Angola is a film archive located in Luanda, Angola.

See also
 List of film archives

Film archives in Africa